"Rock-A-Hula Baby ("Twist" Special)" is a 1961 song recorded by Elvis Presley and performed in the 1961 film Blue Hawaii. The song was also released as a single.

Background
The song was recorded on March 23, 1961 at Radio Recorders in Hollywood, California. The RCA Victor 45 single was released on October 1, 1961. Steve Sholes produced the studio recording session. The Jordanaires provided the backing vocals.

The song was published by Gladys Music, Inc., Elvis Presley's publishing company. It was written by Ben Weisman, Fred Wise, and Dolores Fuller, it is a genre mix of Hawaiian folk and rock and roll. It was the first song published by Fuller, who would eventually co-write a dozen songs for Presley.

The title song of the 1991 film Rock-a-Doodle, which featured Elvis Presley's original backing vocal group The Jordanaires, parodied "Rock-a-Hula Baby".

Charts
"Rock-A-Hula Baby" peaked at No. 23 in the U.S. on the Billboard pop singles chart, No. 1 in Australia, No. 4 in Canada, and No. 1 in the Philippines. In the United Kingdom (UK), where it was a double A-sided release with "Can't Help Falling in Love", it peaked at No. 1 in the UK Singles Chart in February 1962, and spent four weeks at the chart summit. When re-released in March 2005, it reached No. 3 in the UK in a four-week chart run.

Other recordings
Paul Rich, Werner Müller and The London Festival Orchestra & Chorus, Tulsa McLean, Pop Will Eat Itself, Martin Fontaine, Stephen Collins, Terry Buchwald, and Steven Pitman have also recorded the song.

References

Songs about rock music
Twist (dance)
Elvis Presley songs
1961 singles
UK Singles Chart number-one singles
Songs with music by Ben Weisman
Songs with lyrics by Fred Wise (songwriter)
Songs written by Dolores Fuller
Songs written for films
Songs about dancing
1961 songs